Jaragua National Park is a national park of the Dominican Republic. Jaragua National Park is located in the Pedernales Province in the extreme southwest of the Dominican Republic. Jaragua National Park has a total area of 1374 km² (905 km² of which are marine), making it the largest protected area in the Caribbean region.

Geography 
Jaragua National Park was established by Presidential Decree No. 1315 on August 11, 1983, and was named after the Taíno Chiefdom of Xaragua. The park is represented by the Hispaniolan dry forests ecoregion. Spanning the southern slopes of the Baoruco Mountain Range from Oviedo to Cabo Rojo, Jaragua National Park includes dry forest, mangroves, and scrub, as well as land and marine habitats. 

Beata Island (Isla Beata), Alto Velo Island, Bahia de las Aguilas and Lago de Oviedo (noted for its diverse bird life) are part of the park.

Among the variety of habitats found in Jaragua, numerous lagoons are located within its boundaries: Laguna Oviedo, Laguna Salada, Manuel Matos, La Rabiza, Puerto en Medio, Bucán Base, and Salado Bucán.  

It is the only protected area of the Paleoisla del Sur geoformation, and one of two land masses to for the island of La Hispaniola between 20,000 to 30,000 B.C.

References

Sources
Cohen, Saul B. (ed). "Parque Nacional Jaragua." Columbia Gazetteer of North America. New York: Columbia, 2002. 
"Jaragua National Park, Dominican Republic." The Nature Conservancy.  
"Jaragua National Park." UNESCO. 

Geography of Pedernales Province
National parks of the Dominican Republic
Protected areas established in 1983
Biosphere reserves of the Dominican Republic
Biota of Hispaniola
Tourist attractions in Pedernales Province
1983 establishments in the Dominican Republic